Hernán Silva Arce (November 5, 1948 – October 15, 2017) was a Chilean football referee. He is known for having refereed two matches in the FIFA World Cup, one in 1986 (between Canada and France) and one in the 1990 edition (between Cameroon and Romania). He died October 15, 2017.

References

External links
 Hernán Silva at WorldFootball.net

1948 births
2017 deaths
Chilean football referees
FIFA World Cup referees
1986 FIFA World Cup referees
1990 FIFA World Cup referees
Copa América referees
Olympic football referees